The Golden Book of Chemistry Experiments is a children's chemistry book written in 1960 by Robert Brent and illustrated by Harry Lazarus and published by Western Publishing as part of their Golden Books series.

A decade after the book's publication, concerns were raised over the safety of the reactions described, which frequently used or generated toxic or corrosive substances. For example, one experiment generated toxic chlorine gas, and another used carbon tetrachloride, a potent hepatotoxin.

The book was also believed to be a source of inspiration to David Hahn, nicknamed "the Radioactive Boy Scout" by the media, who attempted to construct a nuclear reactor in his mother's shed, although the book does not include any nuclear reactions.

Due to safety concerns, the book was eventually pulled from library shelves. It is now quite rare, and as of February 2023 OCLC lists only 103 copies of this book in libraries worldwide.  However, privately-owned copies are routinely put up for sale online.

Printing history 
The first edition was printed in 1960. A second printing was made in 1962 and a revised edition was printed in 1963.

References

Further reading 
 Full book: https://archive.org/details/GoldenBookOfChemistryExperiments/page/n23

Chemistry books
Children's non-fiction books
1960 children's books
Golden Books books
American children's books